Papyrus 121 (signed as P.Lond. I 121 = PGM VII, TM 60204, LDAB 1321, MP3 0552 + 1868 + 6006 = Van Haelst 1077) is a Greek magical manuscript written in papyrus from the 3rd century CE. This is one of that are called Greek Magical Papyri. The papyri had been brought from Egypt by Ernest Alfred Thompson Wallis Budge.

Description 
This manuscript is preserved in 19 columns, and it has been written by an experienced scribe, who made use of various lectional signs, interpunction, decoration, accurate and regular semi-cursive, with some ligatures and abbreviations. Marks of elision are generally employed. This manuscript also is written along the fibres in columns of 38-40 lines by two hands.

The manuscript is magical, and contains different spells, and also Homeromanteion (Homer oracle). It is classified as magic, divination + medicine + poetry, epic, and lyric. The manuscript is dated between 225 - 320 CE.

ιεωα 
This manuscript contains the Tetragrammaton ιεωα written in col. XV, line 10 (PGM VII:531) in the Victory of Charm.

Actual location 
This manuscript is currently kept in the British Library (London) as Papyrus 121.

References 

3rd-century manuscripts
Greek manuscripts